Ted Baldwin may refer to:

Ted Baldwin (politician) (1922–2008), member of the Queensland Legislative Assembly
Ted Baldwin, fictional character in All for Peggy
Ted Baldwin, fictional character in The Sins of the Children
Ted Baldwin, fictional character in The Valley of Fear
Ted Baldwin Field in Kearney, Nebraska

See also
Edward Baldwin (disambiguation)
Theodore Baldwin (1839–1925), US military officer